The men's points race competition at the 2020 UEC European Track Championships will be held on 14 November 2020.

Results
160 laps (40 km) were raced with 16 sprints.

References

Men's points race
European Track Championships – Men's points race